Karel Hradil (born 27 November 1953) is a retired Czechoslovak triple jumper.

He finished eighth at the 1979 European Indoor Championships. He became Czechoslovak champion in 1979; and Czechoslovak indoor champion in 1977 and 1979.

References

1953 births
Living people
Czechoslovak male triple jumpers